The 1998 AFF Championship, officially known as the 1998 Tiger Cup, was the second edition of the AFF Championship. It was held in Vietnam from 26 August to 5 September 1998.

Thailand had been the defending champions, but lost to Vietnam in the semi-finals. Singapore won the tournament by a 1–0 victory against Vietnam in the finals to take their first title.

Qualification

Four teams qualified directly to the finals.
  (1996 fourth placed)
  (1996 runner-up)
  (defending champions)
  (Hosts, Third Placed)
Four teams qualified via the qualification process.
  (Winner Qualification Group A)
  (Winner Qualification Group B)
  (Runner-up Qualification Group A)
  (Runner-up Qualification Group B)

Venues

Squads

Final tournament
 All times are UTC+7.

Group stage

Group A

Group B

Knockout stage

Semi-finals

Third place play-off

Final

Award

Goalscorers
4 goals
  Myo Hlaing Win

3 goals

  Aji Santoso
  Miro Baldo Bento
  Aung Khine
  Alfredo Razon Gonzalez
  Ahmad Latiff Khamaruddin
  Worrawoot Srimaka
  Nguyễn Hồng Sơn

2 goals

  Bima Sakti
  Widodo Cahyono Putro
  Rafi Ali
  Kritsada Piandit
  Lê Huỳnh Đức

1 goal

  Kurniawan Dwi Yulianto
  Uston Nawawi
  Yusuf Ekodono
  Keolakhone Channiphone
  Kholadeth Phonephachanh
  Win Htike
  Nazri Nasir
  Rudy Khairon Daiman
  R. Sasikumar
  Zulkarnaen Zainal
  Chaichan Knewsen
  Kairung Threjagsang
  Kowit Foythong
  Therdsak Chaiman
  Nguyễn Văn Sỹ
  Trương Việt Hoàng
  Văn Sỹ Hùng

1 own goal

  Mursyid Effendi (playing against Thailand)
  Min Aung (playing against Indonesia)
  Min Thu (playing against Indonesia)

Team statistics
This table will show the ranking of teams throughout the tournament.

Controversy
This tournament was marred by unsportsmanlike conduct in a match between Thailand and Indonesia during the group stage. 

Indonesia was already assured of qualification for the semi-finals, while Thailand would also advance if they did not lose by four goals: however, both teams also knew that the winners of the match would face hosts Vietnam in the semi-finals, while the losing team would face surprise group winners Singapore, who were perceived to be easier opposition, and would also avoid the inconvenience of moving their team's training base from Ho Chi Minh City to Hanoi for the semi-finals. 

The first half saw little action, with both teams barely making any attempt to score. During the second half both teams managed to score, resulting in a 2–2 score after 90 minutes: during injury time, and despite two Thai defenders attempting to stop him, Indonesian defender Mursyid Effendi deliberately scored an own goal, thus handing Thailand a 3–2 victory. FIFA subsequently fined both teams $40,000 for violating the spirit of the game, while Mursyid was banned from domestic football for one year and from international football for life. 

In the semi-finals, Thailand lost to Vietnam, and Indonesia lost to Singapore: in the final, the title was to elude the hosts, as they went down 1–0 to unfancied Singapore, in one of the competition's biggest shocks to date.

References

Further reading
 Courteny, Barrie. "Tiger Cup 1998 - Details". RSSSF. Retrieved 2 March 2010.

 
AFF Championship
AFF Championship tournaments
International association football competitions hosted by Vietnam
AFF Championship, 1998